Circothecidae are a family of Cambrian problematica, sometimes attributed to the Hyolitha, though some authors suggest (on the basis of no specified evidence) that they're definitely not.

References

Cambrian molluscs
Prehistoric animal families
Hyolitha